Bulgarian cuisine is part of the cuisine of Southeast Europe, sharing characteristics with other Balkan cuisines. Bulgarian cooking traditions are diverse because of geographical factors such as climatic conditions suitable for a variety of vegetables, herbs, and fruit. Aside from the vast variety of local Bulgarian dishes, Bulgarian cuisine shares a number of dishes with Persian, Turkish, and Greek cuisine.

Bulgarian cuisine includes a significant contribution from Ottoman cuisine, and therefore shares a number of dishes with Middle Eastern cuisine, including moussaka, gyuvetch, kyufte, baklava, ayran, gyuvech, and shish kebab. Bulgarian food often incorporates salads as appetizers and is also noted for the prominence of dairy products, wines, and other alcoholic drinks such as rakia. The cuisine also features a variety of soups, such as the cold soup tarator, and pastries, such as the filo dough-based banitsa, pita, and the various types of börek.

Main courses are very typically water-based stews, either vegetarian or with lamb, goat meat, veal, chicken, or pork. Deep-frying is not common, but grilling—especially of different kinds of sausages—is prominent. Pork is common, often mixed with veal or lamb, although fish and chicken are also widely used. While most cattle are bred for milk production rather than meat, veal is popular for grilling meat appetizers (meze) and in some main courses. As a substantial exporter of lamb, Bulgaria's own consumption is notable, especially in the spring.

Similar to other Balkan cultures, the per-capita consumption of yogurt among Bulgarians is traditionally higher than the rest of Europe. The country is notable as the historical namesake for Lactobacillus bulgaricus, a microorganism chiefly responsible for the local variety of dairy products. , a white brine cheese similar to feta, is also a popular ingredient used in salads and a variety of pastries.

Holidays are often observed in conjunction with certain meals. On Christmas Eve, for instance, tradition requires vegetarian stuffed peppers and cabbage leaves sarmi. New Year's Eve usually involves cabbage dishes, Nikulden (Day of St. Nicholas, December 6) involves fish (usually carp), while Gergyovden (Day of St. George, May 6) is typically celebrated with roast lamb.

Traditional Bulgarian foods

Bulgarian breakfast
 Banitsa – baked pastry made of layered stuffing and phyllo. There are many varieties with different names, with arguably the most famous one being with eggs, sirene, and yogurt.
 Börek – filled pastry of Turkish origin
 Tutmanik – similar to pita, made with yeast dough and milk,  but with white cheese. 
 Milinki (singular: milinka) – bread roll type pastry with eggs and sirene
 Princess with minced meat – open-faced baked sandwich with minced meat, and possibly some yellow cheese on top
 Princess with yellow cheese – open-faced baked sandwich with yellow cheese on top
 Princess with eggs and cheese – open-faced baked sandwich with egg and sirene mixture on top
 Mekitsi (singular: mekitsa) – deep-fried dough pastry, typically served with jam, honey, sirene, or icing sugar
 French toast (Purjena filia) – bread dipped in eggs and milk (either cow's milk or yogurt) and fried in oil
 Kazanlak doughnuts – a specific type of doughnuts, from the town of Kazanlak
 Buhti (singular: buhta) – deep-fried dough balls, often served with jam, honey, or sirene
 Langidi (singular: langida) – somewhat similar to American-style pancakes, soft and eggy
 Palachinki (singular: palachinka) – Bulgarian-style pancakes that are thinner than American pancakes and sometimes rolled around some stuffing
 Katmi (singular: katma) – another variant of Bulgarian pancakes, which are bigger and thicker and are rolled around stuffing
 Popara – might be made from rusks, bread, or kozunak with tea, milk, or sour milk (Bulgarian yogurt). Quite different from other Bulgarian breakfasts, this one was very popular during the 20th century, and many Bulgarians remember this dish with fondness and childhood nostalgia.

Cold cuts

 Banski starets (also banski staretz) – spicy sausage, native to the Bansko region
 Elenski but – air-cured ham sausage, seasoned with herbs
 Lukanka – spicy salami of minced beef and pork
 Pastarma – spicy beef sausage; a variant of Anatolian dried meat called pastırma in Turkish, pastourmas in Greek, bastirma in Azerbaijani, and basterma in Arabic
 Sujuk (also soudjouk, sukuk, sukuk, or sucuk) – flat cured, dark red sausage, common in the Balkans, Eastern Mediterranean, and North Africa

Soups and stews
 Tarator – cold soup of cucumbers, garlic, yogurt, and dill
 Vegetable soup – with various fresh vegetables and potatoes 
 Nettle soup – with rice and sirene
 Spinach soup – with sirene and eggs
 Bob chorba – hot bean soup
 Lentil soup – brown lentils soup
 Mushroom soup – with forest mushrooms
 Chicken soup – made with vermicelli, potatoes, and vegetables
 Teleshko vareno – boiled veal, potatoes, and vegetables in consommé
 Ribena chorba – a traditional spicy fish soup, made with thyme and fresh lovage
 Topcheta soup – a Bulgarian meatball soup thickened with egg yolks and yogurt
 Lamb soup – made from lamb organ meats
 Kurban chorba – lamb meat and lamb organ meats, eggs, and vegetables
 Shkembe chorba – spicy soup made of tripe, reputed in Bulgaria to be a "hangover cure"
 Pacha – a sour pork's-trotter soup, with sour ingredients such as pickles, bitter fruit, or vinegar in the broth
 Ghivetch – spicy vegetable stew with vegetables and sometimes different meats, often cooked in a clay pot
 Smilyanski fasul – Smilyan bean stew
 Potato stew

Salads

 Ovcharska salata (shepherd's salad) – shopska salad, with the addition of grated egg, mushrooms, and sometimes ham
 Ruska salata (Russian salad) – salad with potatoes, carrots, gherkins, and mayonnaise
 Shopska salad – a common salad of chopped cucumbers, onions, peppers, and tomatoes with white cheese 
 Snezhanka ("Snow White salad") – chopped cucumbers with yogurt, dill, garlic, and often walnuts
 Turshiya (also torsi) – pickled vegetables, such as celery, beets, cauliflower, and cabbage, popular in wintertime; variations are selska turshiya (country pickle) and tsarska turshiya (king's pickles)

Sauces, relishes, and appetizers

 Lyutenitsa (also lyutenitza) – purée of tomatoes, red peppers, and carrots, often served on bread and topped with white cheese
 Kyopulu (also kyopolou) – roasted eggplant (aubergine) and bell peppers, mashed with parsley, garlic, and other ingredients<ref>Kay, p. 57, Sachsenroeder, p. 143; DK Eyewitness Travel Guide: Bulgaria (DK: rev. ed. 2011), p. 233</ref>
 Lyutika – spicy sauce
 Podluchen sauce or yogurt sauce – yogurt with garlic, oil, paprika, salt, and sometimes dill
 Katino meze – hot starter with chopped pork meat, onion, and mushrooms with fresh butter and spices
 Drob po selski – chopped liver with onion and peppers
 Ezik v maslo – sliced tongue in butter
 Sirene pane – breaded Bulgarian brine white cheese bites
 Kashkaval pane – breaded kashkaval bites
 Mussels in butter – with onion and fresh herbs; traditionally from Sozopol

Skara (grill)

 Kyufte – meatballs of minced pork meat, seasoned with traditional spices and shaped in a flattened ball
 Kebapche – similar to meatballs, but seasoned with cumin and shaped in a stick
 Parjola – pork steak, chop, or flank
 Shishcheta – marinated pieces of chicken or pork and vegetables
 Karnache – a type of sausage with special spices
 Nadenitsa – a type of sausage with special spices
 Tatarsko kyufte – stuffed meatballs
 Nevrozno kyufte – very piquant meatballs
 Chicken in caul
 Cheverme – used in celebrations such as weddings, graduations, and birthdays; a whole animal, traditionally a pig, but also chicken or a lamb, is slowly cooked in an open fire, rotated manually on a wooden skewer from 4 to 7 hours
 Meshana skara (mixed grill plate) – consists of kebapche, kyufte, shishche, and karnache or nadenitsa Grilled vegetables – usually a garnish or a side dish
 Grilled fish (saltwater or freshwater)

Main dishes

 Ghivetch Yahniya
 Plakiya Sarma
 Drob Sarma Wine, Tepsi, or Tas kebab
 Kavarma Kapama Mish-mash – popular summer dish made with tomatoes, peppers, onion, white brine cheese, eggs, and fresh spices
 Pilaf – rice with chopped meat, vegetables, or mussels
 Moussaka Chomlek Mlin Stuffed courgettes
 Pulneni chushki – Bulgarian stuffed bell peppers
 Peppers börek Roasted beans
 Beans with sausage		
 Pork with rice
 Roasted chicken with potatoes
 Pork with cabbage
 Chicken with cabbage
 Roasted potatoes
 Drusan kebab
 Rice with chicken
 Tatarian meatball
 Meatball(s) with white sauce stew
 Kjufteta po Chirpanski – meatballs with potatoes; a recipe from Chirpan
 Meatloaf 'Rulo "Stephanie"'
 Potato balls with sauce
 Panagyurishte-style eggs
 Fried courgettes with yogurt sauce
 Chicken in katmi – popular in a "Thracian" variety
 Fish Zelnik – with sauerkraut and rice
 Fish in pastry – usually in celebration of St. Nicholas
 Stuffed carp or Nikuldenski carp – prepared for the feast of St. Nicholas

Breads and pastries

 Pita
 Sweet pita
 Pita with meat – variably with mushrooms or with tomatoes and onion
 Pogača (usual ritual bread)
 Kravai (usual ritual bread)
 Kolach (usual ritual bread)
 Banitsa – the most popular pastry in Bulgaria with a number of varieties
 Tikvenik – banitsa with pumpkins
 Zelnik – banitsa with white brine cheese and cabbage, spinach, leek, scallion, parsley, or sorrel
 Baklava Saraliya Parlenki Patatnik Kačamak Byal Mazh Tutmanik Milinka Gevrek Kozunak Mekitsi – deep fried kneaded dough made with yogurt and eggs
 Marudnitsi Katmi – a variety of pancakes
 Palachinki – a variety of crêpes 
 Langidi Tiganitsi (similar to Mekitsi)
 Dudnik Popara Sulovar Parjeni filii – "fried toasts"
 Kiflichki with jam or white cheese
 Solenki Yufka
 Trienitsa or skrob TrahanaDairy products

Bulgaria has a strong tradition of using milk and dairy products. Bulgaria even has a namesake strain of bacteria, Lactobacillus bulgaricus, used to make many of its cheeses and fermented foods which gives it a distinct in its flavor.

 Sirene – soft and salty white brine cheese that appears in many Bulgarian dishes
 Kashkaval – hard yellow cheese, often used in appetizers; kashkaval Vitosha is made from cow's milk, while kashkaval Balkan is made from ewe's milk
 Kiselo mlyako – Bulgarian yogurt, produced using Lactobacillus delbrueckii subsp. bulgaricus; used in many Bulgarian dishes
 Smetana – sour cream
 Izvara – cottage cheese, quark
 Katak – a traditional fermented curd/yogurt-like product

Sweets

The name halva is used for several related varieties of the Middle Eastern dessert. Tahan / tahini halva is the most popular version, available in two different types with sunflower and with sesame seed. Traditionally, the regions of Yablanitsa and Haskovo are famous manufacturers of halva.

 Pumpkin dessert
 Baklava Kadaif
 Revane
 Buhti with yogurt
 Tolumbi – fried choux pastry cakes soaked in syrup which is usually made with honey
 Cookies "Peach" or Praskovki
 Fruit bread
 Biscuit cake 
 Torta Garash (Garash cake)
 Katmi with jam or honey or cheese (today usually with added chocolate)
 Skalichki Kazanlak Donuts
 Kazanlak Korabii – a scone like pastry that is egg washed and sprinkled with sugar
 Keks – similar to marble cake
 Kompot Kozunak Kurabiiki Lokum
 Maslenki Milk with rice
 Oshav Tart with cherries or sour cherries – traditionally from Bobov dol
 Tart with different fruits
 Tatlii TikvenikSpices and herbs
Summer savory (Chubritsa)
Spearmint (Djodjen)Sharena solOther staples
 Honey

Traditional Bulgarian drinks
Wine

 Mavrud
 Pamid
 Gamza
 Melnik wine
 Dimyat
 Misket
 Muskat
 Nohan or Lipa
 Divachka
 Shivka
 Rubin
 Tamyanka

Beer

Ariana
Astika
Boliarka
Burgasko
Britos
Kamenitza
Ledenika
Lomsko
MM
Pirinsko
Plevensko
Shumensko
Stolichno
Zagorka

Distilled liqueurs

 Rakia Slivovitsa Gyulova rakia (rose rakia)
 Muskat rakia Mastika Menta Pelin wine

Fermented beverages
 Boza – the most popular recipes are from Radomir and Lyubimets
 Ayran (or ayryan) – cold, yogurt-based beverage
 Matenitsa – Bulgarian buttermilk

Hot beverages
 Tea – usually prepared with one or several herbs, rose, or fruits
 Greyana rakia (boiled rakia) – winter alcoholic beverage
 Greyano vino (mulled wine) – winter alcoholic beverage

See also

 European cuisine
 List of cuisines
 Cuisine of the Mediterranean
 Eastern European cuisine
 Macedonian cuisine

Notes

ReferencesDK Eyewitness Travel Guide: Bulgaria (DK: rev. ed. 2011).
Jonathan Bousfield & Matthew Willis, DK Eyewitness Travel: Bulgaria (DK: 2008).
James I. Deutsch, "Bulgaria" in Ethnic American Food Today: A Cultural Encyclopedia (ed. Lucy M. Long: Rowman & Littlefield, 2015).
Annie Kay, Bulgaria (Bradt Travel Guides: 2nd ed. 2015), p. 57.
Fiona Ross, "Bulgaria" in Food Cultures of the World Encyclopedia (ed. Ken Albala: ABC-CLIO, 2011).
Agnes Sachsenroeder, CultureShock! Bulgaria: A Survival Guide to Customs and Etiquette'' (Marshall Cavendish: 2nd ed. 2011).

 
Balkan cuisine